is a Japanese anime series adapted from the manga of the same name by Rumiko Takahashi. It was created by Studio Deen and aired weekly between April 15, 1989 and September 16, 1989 on Fuji TV before being canceled after 18 episodes due to low ratings. Shortly after, the series was reworked by most of the same staff, retitled  and launched in a different time slot, running between October 20, 1989 and September 25, 1992 for 143 episodes.

Three movies were produced, The Battle of Nekonron, China! A Battle to Defy the Rules! on November 2, 1991; Battle at Togenkyo! Get Back the Brides on August 1, 1992; and Super Indiscriminate Decisive Battle! Team Ranma vs. the Legendary Phoenix on August 20, 1994. The first two movies are feature length, but the third was originally aired in theaters with two other movies: Ghost Sweeper Mikami and Heisei Dog Stories: Bow. Following the ending of the TV series, 12 OVA episodes were released directly to home video, the earliest on December 7, 1993 and the twelfth on October 20, 2010. In celebration of Rumiko Takahashi's 35th anniversary as a manga artist, the TV series was released on Blu-ray for the first time in three box sets between May 24, 2013 and January 24, 2014.

Viz Media licensed both anime, the films and the first 11 OVAs for English dubs in North America. They labeled both anime as one series and first released it on subtitled and dubbed VHS, later combining it into seven DVD collections they call "seasons". Besides changing the ordering of many of the anime episodes, Viz also added the third film to their set of the OVAs. They began re-releasing the show on Blu-ray and DVD in 2014. Madman Entertainment released part of the anime series and the first two movies in Australasia, before their license expired, and MVM Films released the first two movies in the United Kingdom.

Series overview

Episode list
A note on the "Season" nomenclature:

The "seasons" that comprise the following list correspond to the box sets released in North America by Viz Media, which combined both the first Ranma ½ anime and  into one series and changed the order of many episodes. In Japan, each Ranma ½ anime was aired continuously, with regular pre-emptions for sporting events and television specials, and not split into standard seasonal cycles. The new Viz releases issued throughout 2014 and 2015 come in revised sets that are compiled in original production order and contain 23 episodes per set.

Season 1 "Digital Dojo" (1989)

Season 2 "Anything-Goes Martial Arts" (1989–1990)

Season 3 "Hard Battle" (1990)

Season 4 "Outta Control" (1990–91)
Note: Episode 51 was not included in Viz's season 4 release, but in season 3. It is shown below for proper chronological purposes.

Season 5 "Martial Mayhem" (1991)
Note Episode 72 was not included in Viz's season 5 release, but in season 4. It is shown below for proper chronological purposes.

Season 6 "Random Rhapsody" (1991–92)

Season 7 "Ranma Forever" (1992)

Films (1991–1994)

OVAs (1993–2008)
Following the ending of the TV series, 11 OVAs were released directly to home video, the earliest on October 21, 1993 and the eleventh on June 4, 1996. All but three are based on stories originally in the manga.

Viz Media released all 11 OVAs in North American in one set. It also includes the third film, Super Indiscriminate Decisive Battle! Team Ranma vs. the Legendary Phoenix, added as the ninth episode, bringing the set's episode count to 12.

Twelve years after the eleventh OVA was released, a new piece of Ranma ½ animation was made for the "It's a Rumic World" exhibition of Rumiko Takahashi's artwork. It is based on the "Nightmare! Incense of Deep Sleep" manga story from volume 34, and was shown on odd numbered days at the exhibition in Tokyo from July 30 to August 11, 2008. This half-hour special was directed by Takeshi Mori (an episode director on the first season of the TV series) with animation direction by Ranma veteran animator and character designer Atsuko Nakajima. But it was not released until January 29, 2010, when it was put in a DVD box set with the Urusei Yatsura and InuYasha specials that premiered at the same exhibit. It was then released on DVD and Blu-ray by itself on October 20, 2010.

Theme songs
Many of the theme songs are sung by DoCo, a band formed by the five of the voice actress. DoCo USA is the name used by their corresponding English voice actors.

Opening themes:
 "It's Love! Panic!" (恋だ!パニック Koi da! Panikku) by Yawmin (1-6)
 "Us from Now On" (僕たちはこれから Bokutachi wa Kore Kara) by DoCo (7)
 "In the Middle of Elementary School" (授業中の小学校 Jugyōchū no Shōgakkō) by DoCo (8)
 "Neverending Summer Vacation" (終わらない夏休み Owaranai Natsu Yasumi) by DoCo (9, AKA Movie 3)
 "The Sparkling Sky & Your Voice" (かがやく空ときみの声 Kagayaku Sora to Kimi no Koe) by DoCo (10)
 "Full of Memories" (思い出がいっぱい Omoide ga Ippai) by DoCo (11)
 "Mutual Love is Complex (Live)" (フクザツな両想いLive Version Fukuzatsu na Ryōomoi Live Version) by DoCo (12)

Ending themes:
 "The Ballad of Ranma & Akane" (乱馬とあかねのバラード Ranma to Akane no Barādo) by Kappei Yamaguchi and Noriko Hidaka (1-6)
 "A Pure and Honest Christmas" (清く正しいクリスマス Kiyoku Tadashii Kurisumasu) by DoCo (7)
 "Red Shoe Sunday" (赤い靴のSUNDAY Akai Kutsu no Sunday) by DoCo (8)
 "Liar" (うそつき Usotsuki) by DoCo (9, AKA Movie 3)
 "A Slightly Hilly Road" (少しだけ坂道 Sukoshi Dake Sakamichi) by DoCo (10)
 "Love Vanished Once, Regrettably" (恋がひとつ消えてしまったの Koi ga Hitotsu Kiete Shimatta no) by DoCo (11)
 "Boyfriend" (彼 Kare) by DoCo (12)

Opening themes, Western release:
 "Love Panic! (English Version)" by Connie Lavigne (1-6)
 "Where Do We Go From Here (You and Me) (English Version)" by DoCo USA (7-12)

Ending themes, Western release:
 "The Ballad of Ranma & Akane" (乱馬とあかねのバラード Ranma to Akane no Barādo) by Kappei Yamaguchi and Noriko Hidaka (1-6)
 "Red Shoe Sunday (English Version)" by DoCo USA (7-12)

Specials (1990–2011)
Ranma ½ had a handful of specials that were only available through home videos, or being a member of the Kitty Animation Circle, the fanclub for the production team that created Rumiko Takahashi's anime. These specials are extremely rare for the most part. With the exception of TV Titles (which was released in North America as The Ranma ½ Video Jukebox), none of the specials have been released outside Japan.

Opening Theme:
 "Tendo Family's Annoying Acquaintance": "Don't Make Me Wild Like You (Don't Make Me Be a Violent Girl)" (じゃじゃ馬にさせないで Jajauma ni Sasenaide) by Etsuko Nishio
 "Huge Battle! 29 Unteachable Fools": None
Ending Theme
 "Tendo Family's Annoying Acquaintance": "Friends" (フレンズ Furenzu) by YAWMIN
 "Huge Battle! 29 Unteachable Fools": "Hill of the Rainbow and the Sun" (虹と太陽の丘 Niji to Taiyō no Oka) by Piyo Piyo
 "Ranma 1/2 Live-action Special": "Chikutaku 2Nite" (チクタク☆２NITE) by 9nine

References

Episodes
Ranma 1 2